Joan Anna Dalziel Seccombe, Baroness Seccombe,  (born 3 May 1930, née Owen) is a British Conservative Party politician.

She was created a Dame Commander of the Order of the British Empire (DBE) in the 1984 Birthday Honours, and was created a life peer on 14 February 1991 taking the title Baroness Seccombe, of Kineton in the County of Warwickshire.

From 1997 to 2001 she was Opposition Whip. Since 2006 she is the Opposition Spokesperson for Constitutional and Legal Affairs/Justice.

Arms

References

External links
 
 Profile (subscription required)
 "The Papers of Enoch Powell"
 Extract from Hansard
 Reference to Seccombe in The Independent

1930 births
Conservative Party (UK) life peers
Life peeresses created by Elizabeth II
Living people
Dames Commander of the Order of the British Empire
Place of birth missing (living people)